Newtown railway station is a railway station serving Newtown, Powys, Wales.

History
Newtown was the last major station before  where the Mid-Wales Railway, to Llanidloes, Rhayader, Builth Road and on to Cardiff (with a branch to Brecon), diverged from the Cambrian Railways main line (today's Cambrian Line) to Machynlleth and Aberystwyth.

The station was the eastern terminus of the Newtown and Machynlleth Railway opened by the Countess of Londonderry at Machynlleth station on 3 January 1863.  It was also originally served by the (now mostly defunct) Llanidloes and Newtown Railway (opened in 1859 and initially isolated from the rest of the Welsh railway system) and the Oswestry and Newtown Railway (opened in 1861). All were subsequently subsumed into the Cambrian by 1865.

The Mid-Wales line passenger service was withdrawn on 31 December 1962, though trains to and from this route latterly started and terminated at Moat Lane Junction. Services to Oswestry and Whitchurch via the former O&NR Cambrian main line ended in January 1965, when the route east of Buttington closed to passenger traffic as a consequence of the Beeching cuts.

Facilities

The station currently has two through platforms, which are used separately for trains in either direction. The station is usually used as one of the passing points for trains on the Cambrian Line as it is a single track. The station has one west facing bay platform/siding which is periodically used as a storage point for Network Rail's departmental trains.

There is a Transport for Wales appointed "Station Agent" with full ticket issuing facilities in the main building. It also have computer training centre. Train running information is provided by digital CIS displays, automatic announcements and customer help points on both platforms. Step-free access is available on both platforms.

Services
There is a basic two-hourly service each way – on weekdays and Saturdays there are also some additional Shrewsbury to Aberystwyth services during the mornings and evenings. On Sundays there is a two-hourly service on the Shrewsbury – Aberystwyth axis, but only a limited service along the coast to/from Pwllheli (three in summer and one in winter).

References

Further reading

External links 

Railway stations in Powys
DfT Category E stations
Former Cambrian Railway stations
Railway stations in Great Britain opened in 1861
Railway stations served by Transport for Wales Rail
1861 establishments in Wales
railway station
Grade II listed buildings in Powys
Grade II listed railway stations in Wales